Farm to Market Roads in Texas are owned and maintained by the Texas Department of Transportation (TxDOT).

FM 3300

FM 3300 (1973)

The original FM 3300 was designated on September 5, 1973, from FM 2846, 5.5 miles north of Dundee, west 1.4 miles to a county road. FM 3300 was cancelled on December 31, 1975, and became a portion of FM 1180.

FM 3301

Farm to Market Road 3301 (FM 3301) is located in Montague County. The roadway beyond the northern terminus is Uselton Road.

FM 3301 was designated on September 5, 1973, along its current route.

FM 3302

FM 3302 (1973)

FM 3302 was cancelled on December 15, 1983, by district request and transferred to RM 1474.

FM 3303

FM 3304

FM 3305

FM 3306

RM 3307

FM 3308

Farm to Market Road 3308 (FM 3308) is located in Taylor County in northern Abilene.

FM 3308 begins at an intersection with FM 600 near County Road 501. The highway travels in a northeastern direction along Neas Road, ending at an intersection with FM 2833.

FM 3308 was designated on September 5, 1973, along the current route. On June 27, 1995, the entire route was redesignated Urban Road 3308 (UR 3308). The designation reverted to FM 3308 with the elimination of the Urban Road system on November 15, 2018.

FM 3309

FM 3310

FM 3311

FM 3312

Farm to Market Road 3312 (FM 3312) was located in Angelina County.

The highway was cancelled and re-designated as an extension of FM 819 on April 25, 2002.

FM 3313

FM 3314

FM 3315

FM 3316

FM 3317

FM 3318

FM 3319

FM 3319 (1973)

FM 3319 was cancelled on August 29, 1974, and removed from the highway system in exchange for extending FM 1162.

FM 3320

FM 3321

FM 3321 (1973)

FM 3321 was cancelled on November 25, 1975, and removed from the highway system; the funds released were used towards future Farm to Market road projects in the county.

FM 3322

FM 3323

FM 3324

FM 3325

FM 3326

FM 3326 (1974)

FM 3326 was cancelled on May 4, 1976, and removed from the highway system when the county refused construction.

FM 3327

FM 3328

FM 3328 (1974)

FM 3328 was cancelled on December 31, 1975, and became a portion of FM 2326.

FM 3329

FM 3330

FM 3331

FM 3332

FM 3333

FM 3334

Farm to Market Road 3334 (FM 3334) is located in southwestern Reeves County. It connects FM 2903 to SH 17 near Verhalen.

FM 3334 begins at FM 2903 between Balmorhea and Toyah.

FM 3334 was originally designated on May 7, 1974, from SH 17 to a point  to the west. The route was extended to FM 2903 on May 27, 1976.

FM 3335

FM 3336

FM 3337

FM 3337 (1974)

The original FM 3337 was designated on May 7, 1974, from FM 251 south  to FM 249 in Bloomburg. On September 29, 1977, the road was extended northwest  from FM 251. FM 3337 was cancelled on June 5, 1987, by district request and transferred to FM 3129.

FM 3338

Farm to Market Road 3338 (FM 3338) is located in Webb County. Its southern terminus is at FM 1472 (Mines Road) in northern Laredo. It runs northwest into unincorporated areas as Las Tiendas Road before reaching its northern terminus at SH 255. North of here, Las Tiendas Road continues as an unimproved road.

FM 3338 was designated on May 7, 1974, to run from FM 1472 to a point  to the northwest. It was extended to its current northern terminus on November 25, 1975.

FM 3339

FM 3340

FM 3341

FM 3342

FM 3343

FM 3344

FM 3344 (1975)

The original FM 3344 was designated on November 25, 1975, from FM 518, west of FM 1128, west to proposed SH 288. FM 3344 was cancelled on September 13, 1984, by district request and transferred to FM 518 after it was rerouted.

FM 3345

Farm to Market Road 3345 (FM 3345) is located in Fort Bend County in Missouri City. The highway is known locally as Cartwright Road, which continues west to Dulles Avenue.

FM 3345 begins at an intersection with FM 1092 in the Quail Valley area. The highway travels in an eastern direction through a heavily suburban area, ending at an intersection with FM 2234.

FM 3345 was designated on November 25, 1975, along the current route. On June 27, 1995, the entire route was redesignated Urban Road 3345 (UR 3345). The designation reverted to FM 3345 with the elimination of the Urban Road system on November 15, 2018.

FM 3346

RM 3347

RM 3348

RM 3348 (1975)

The original RM 3348 was designated on November 25, 1975. However, the right-of-way was deemed too expensive, and Gillespie County officials withdrew their support for the route. The designation was cancelled on September 28, 1977.

FM 3349

Farm to Market Road 3349 (FM 3349) is located in Williamson County.

FM 3349 is a rural, two-lane route for its entire length. Its southern terminus is at FM 1660 in the community of Norman's Crossing. It travels north through unincorporated Williamson County before ending at an intersection with US 79 in Frame Switch, a tiny community of 20 people west of Taylor.

The designation was extended to the junction with FM 1660 on September 29, 1977.

FM 3350

FM 3351

Farm to Market Road 3351 (FM 3351) Is a  route in Bexar, Comal, and Kendall counties. It is known locally as Ralph Fair Road, Curry Creek Road, and Bergheim–Kendalia Road. The highway begins in Leon Springs at an intersection with I-10, and it continues northward and passes Camp Stanley. Then the highway continues through Fair Oaks Ranch and crosses Cibolo Creek. FM 3351 continues northward to Bergheim and intersects SH 46; next FM 3351 ends at Kendalia at an intersection with RM 473.

FM 3351 was designated on November 25, 1975, from IH-10 northward to the Comal county line. On April 26, 1979, it extended north  to a road intersection in Comal County. On February 26, 1986, it extended north to FM 475 (which became part of SH 46 on September 28, 1988; the section north of the county line was part of RM 3160 until November 19, 1979). On May 25, 1993, it extended north to its current terminus, replacing RM 3160.

Junction list

FM 3352

FM 3353

FM 3354

FM 3355

FM 3356

FM 3357

FM 3358

FM 3358 (1975)

The first use of the FM 3358 designation was in Navarro County as a  loop off FM 416 from 6.5 miles northeast of Streetman to near Winkler. FM 3358 was cancelled on February 28, 1977, and removed from the highway system in exchange for creation of FM 3383.

FM 3358 (1978)

The next use of the FM 3358 designation was in Armstrong County, from FM 2301, 3 miles south of Wayside, west  to the Randall County line. FM 3358 was cancelled on December 15, 1983, by district request and transferred to FM 1075.

FM 3359

FM 3360

Farm to Market Road 3360 (FM 3360) was located in Chambers County. No highway currently uses the FM 3360 designation.

FM 3360 was cancelled on June 30, 2016, and returned to the city of Mont Belvieu.

FM 3361

FM 3362

FM 3363

FM 3364

FM 3365

FM 3366

Farm to Market Route 3366 (FM 3366) is a  route located in Young County. The road begins at SH 79 southwest of Olney and travels northward before ending at FM 210. It passes to the east of Olney Municipal Airport.

FM 3366 was designated on May 25, 1976, along its current route.

FM 3367

FM 3368

FM 3369

FM 3370

FM 3371

FM 3372

FM 3373

FM 3374

FM 3374 (1976)

The original FM 3374 was designated on July 15, 1976, from Loop 336 and SH 105 west of Conroe south  to FM 2854. FM 3374 was cancelled by district request on February 23, 1989, and was redesignated as an extension of Loop 336.

FM 3375

Farm to Market Road 3375 (FM 3375) is located in Falls County.

FM 3375 begins at an intersection with FM 147 near McClanahan. The highway travels in a generally northwest direction through rural farming areas, ending at an intersection with FM 2307 northeast of Marlin.

The current FM 3375 was designated on October 21, 1981, along its current route.

FM 3375 (1976)

The highway was cancelled on May 22, 1979, when FM 1976 was rerouted. The old route of FM 1976 was redesignated as a spur connection of FM 1976 (this spur connection became FM 3502, which was cancelled due to the rerouting of FM 1516).

FM 3376

FM 3377

FM 3378

FM 3379

FM 3380

Farm to Market Road 3380 (FM 3380) is located in El Paso County. It connects I-10 to the border with Mexico at the Tornillo–Guadalupe International Bridge and the Marcelino Serna Port of Entry.

FM 3380 (1976)

The original FM 3380 was designated on May 25, 1976, from US 281 east of Los Indios south  to the then-proposed New International Bridge at the Rio Grande. FM 3380 was cancelled on April 15, 1992, and transferred to FM 509.

FM 3381

FM 3382

FM 3383

FM 3384

FM 3385

FM 3386

FM 3387

FM 3388

FM 3389

FM 3390

FM 3391

FM 3392

FM 3393

FM 3394

Farm to Market Road 3394 (FM 3394) is located in north central Montague County.

FM 3394 begins at an intersection with FM 1759 north of Nocona, heading north on a two-lane undivided road, and passes Molsbee Cemetery. The FM 3394 designation ends farther to the north, with the roadway continuing north as Hinton Road.

FM 3394 was designated on September 29, 1977, along its current route.

FM 3395

FM 3396

FM 3396 (1977)

On May 18, 1978, FM 3396 was cancelled and became a portion of RM 3260.

FM 3397

FM 3398

Farm to Market Road 3398 (FM 3398) is located in northeastern Reeves County and western Ward County.

The two-lane road proceeds to the east and crosses the Pecos River before entering Ward County. The route turns to the northeast and intersects FM 873 before ending at FM 516 northwest of Barstow.

FM 3398 was designated along its present alignment on September 29, 1977.

Junction list

FM 3399

Farm to Market Road 3399 (FM 3399) is located in Coke County. It begins at SH 70 and runs along the southern shore of the Oak Creek Reservoir.

FM 3399 was designated on September 29, 1977, along the current route.

References

+33
Farm to market roads 3300
Farm to market roads 3300